Wale Musa Alli (born 31 December 2000) is a Nigerian professional footballer who plays as a winger for Zbrojovka Brno.

References

External links
 

2000 births
Living people
Sportspeople from Lagos
Nigerian footballers
Association football wingers
FC Zbrojovka Brno players
Czech First League players
Nigerian expatriate footballers
Nigerian expatriate sportspeople in the Czech Republic
Expatriate footballers in the Czech Republic